Cold Springs is an unincorporated community in Benton County, Missouri, United States.

References

Unincorporated communities in Benton County, Missouri
Unincorporated communities in Missouri